Zabłudów Synagogue - a former wooden synagogue building, located in Zabłudów, Poland, was erected in the 2nd quarter of the 17th century. It was burned to the ground by the German occupying authorities in June 1941 immediately after their conquest of the town.

History 
In the 17th century the town was owned by the Radziwiłł family. In 1635 permission was granted by Krzysztof Radziwiłł for the construction of the synagogue. Most likely this was built by his son Janusz Radziwiłł in 1640. Over the years it was permanently extended and altered. The last alterations took place between 1895 and 1923. It was burnt down by German soldiers in the first days of the invasion of the Soviet Union in June 1941.

A replica of the Zabłudów synagogue was made in 2004 at the University of Wisconsin in the course study.

Architecture 
The main hall was built of horizontal timbers and was nearly square in plan (11.30 × 11.70m). The walls had a height of 6.50m; the height to the most elevated point of the barrel vault was 9.75m. Originally the main hall would have been lit by 8 two-light windows, 2 in each wall. Following addition of a women's prayer room on the upper level, the west windows were removed. Already in 1646 it had been decided to build a women's room at ground level. In later years 2 corner pavilions were added. In 1765 restoration of the entire building was undertaken and at the beginning of the 18th century the vestibule was enlarged and a women's room was constructed above it. The shape of the roof was altered several times.

The Holy Ark was elevated on 2 levels and composed of elements of varied artistic and material quality.

The Bimah was an octagonal little building-chapel with 2 porches over the stairs. It was located near the entrance.

Gallery

Weblinks 
 https://sztetl.org.pl/en/towns/z/845-zabludow/112-synagogues-prayer-houses-and-others/90250-our-ancient-synagogue-zabludow

References

Former synagogues in Poland
Synagogues in Poland destroyed by Nazi Germany
Wooden synagogues
Buildings and structures demolished in 1941
17th-century synagogues
Buildings and structures destroyed during World War II